Oliva amethystina is a species of sea snail, a marine gastropod mollusk in the family Olividae, the olives.

Subspecies
 Oliva amethystina amethystina (Röding, 1798)
 Oliva amethystina guttata Lamarck, 1811

Distribution
This marine species occurs off Papua New Guinea.

References

 Raven J.G.M. (Han) & Recourt P. (2018). Notes on molluscs from NW Borneo. 4. Olivoidea (Gastropoda, Neogastropoda), with the description of eight new species. Vita Malacologica. 17: 113-155.
 Tursch B., Germain L. & Greifeneder D. (1986). Studies on Olividae. IV. Oliva annulata Gmelin, 1791 (of authors): a confusion of species. Indo-Malayan Zoology. 3: 189-216

External links
 Röding, P.F. (1798). Museum Boltenianum sive Catalogus cimeliorum e tribus regnis naturæ quæ olim collegerat Joa. Fried Bolten, M. D. p. d. per XL. annos proto physicus Hamburgensis. Pars secunda continens Conchylia sive Testacea univalvia, bivalvia & multivalvia. Trapp, Hamburg. viii, 199 pp.
  Link, D.H.F. (1807-1808). Beschreibung der Naturalien-Sammlung der Universität zu Rostock. Adlers Erben

amethystina
Gastropods described in 1798